Dineutus sublineatus is a species of whirligig beetle in the family Gyrinidae. It is found in Central America and the Southwestern United States.

References

Further reading

External links

 

Gyrinidae
Articles created by Qbugbot
Beetles described in 1834